The 2018 Maryland Terrapins football team represented the University of Maryland during the 2018 NCAA Division I FBS football season. The Terrapins played their home games at Maryland Stadium in College Park, Maryland and competed in the East Division of the Big Ten Conference.

Following the death of offensive lineman Jordan McNair during a spring football practice, significant scrutiny was laid on head coach D. J. Durkin and his football staff. Following an investigation, Durkin was suspended and offensive coordinator Matt Canada was named interim coach. Durkin was fired on October 31, despite an internal investigation finding that the team did not have a "toxic culture".

In the Terrapins' first game of the year, they defeated then-No. 23 Texas in a game played at FedExField, home of the Washington Redskins. In the team's home opener two weeks later, the team was upset by Temple. In Big Ten Conference play, the team secured wins against Minnesota, Rutgers, and Illinois. In a late-November game against eventual Big Ten champion Ohio State, Maryland took the Buckeyes to overtime, but lost on an unsuccessful two-point conversion attempt that would have won the game. Maryland finished in fifth in the East Division with a record of 5–7, 3–6 in conference play.

Kasim Hill started at quarterback for the Terrapins until he suffered a torn ACL in the game against Indiana on November 10. Tyrell Pigrome started the remainder of the season. Running back Anthony McFarland Jr. led the team with over 1,000 yards rushing. On defense, linebacker Tre Watson led the Big Ten Conference with five interceptions and was named first team all-conference by the media.

Previous season
The Terrapins finished the 2017 season 4–8, 2–7 in Big Ten play to finish in a tie for sixth place in the East Division.

Player death and culture controversy

On May 29, Jordan McNair, a 19-year-old offensive lineman for Maryland, collapsed during a strenuous practice. He was hospitalized after visibly showing signs of extreme exhaustion with a body temperature of  recorded upon arrival. He was later airlifted to the R Adams Cowley Shock Trauma Center to receive an emergency liver transplant, where he died on June 13. Though no cause of death was initially listed for McNair, findings published by ESPN in August show that he likely died of a heat stroke, with teammates and medical staff noticing an apparent seizure one hour before a 911 call was placed. This corroborated a statement made by his parents a month earlier.

An investigation started immediately after his death showed that McNair first showed signs of heat illness at 4:59 PM but did not arrive at the hospital for treatment until 6:36 PM. A second investigation, into the culture of the Maryland football program, was started after ESPN published an investigative article in August 2018. Multiple staffers were suspended and the strength and conditioning coach named as the main abuser in the ESPN report, Rick Court, resigned almost immediately after being suspended. Head coach D.J. Durkin was also suspended and Matt Canada was named interim coach; after the second investigation concluded that Maryland football did not have, by definition, a toxic culture, Durkin was reinstated on October 30. Following intense uproar and protest over his return, Durkin was personally fired the next day by University President Wallace Loh.

Preseason

Award watch lists

Schedule

Game summaries

vs Texas

After a tumultuous offseason, Maryland emerged victorious against Texas 34-29 after shaking off a 30+ minute thunder delay. In Matt Canada's debut as interim head coach, Maryland forced three turnovers in the final 6:09 of the game after losing a 24-7 lead. Freshman Jeshaun Jones, in his first career game, completed the trifecta by passing for a touchdown, receiving a touchdown, and rushing for a touchdown. Most notably, the Terrapins paid tribute to the late Jordan McNair by lining up with 10 players on their first offensive play. Maryland waited for a delay of game penalty and Texas declined the penalty in a show of good sportsmanship.

at Bowling Green

Temple

Minnesota

at Michigan

Rutgers

at Iowa

Illinois

Michigan State

at Indiana

Ohio State

at Penn State

Roster

Awards and honors

2019 NFL Draft

Notes 
1.First name spelled as "Brendon" in the reference and as "Brendan" in the team roster.

References

Maryland
Maryland Terrapins football seasons
Maryland Terrapins football